Züünkhangai is a sum (district) of Uvs Province in western Mongolia. The sum is in the Khan Khökhii mountains.

Populated places in Mongolia
Districts of Uvs Province